The  Newton Chikli Colliery disaster, Chhindwara (M.P.), India occurred on 10 December 1954. This incident occurred due to flooding of the mine  caused by inrush of water from old workings of the same mine.  Total 63 persons were entrapped and got drowned.

There were 112 persons inside the mine when it was inundated. 49 persons managed to effect their escape through the incline; the remaining 63 persons were entrapped and drowned.

Cause 
The working was abandoned in 1933 at one seam. A substantial quantity of water had accumulated in the abandoned workings between 1933 and 1954. New working was started below 13 metres of this seam. The new workings in Bottom seam got connected with the old water-logged workings and water rushed into the new workings, flooding them. The old workings had not been shown correctly on the plan. The management was not aware that the new workings had approached so close to the abandoned workings.

See also 
 List of wars and disasters by death toll: Flood disasters
 National Geographic Seconds From Disaster episodes

References

Mining disasters in India
Accident
1954 in India
1954 disasters in India
Coal mining disasters in India
Disasters in Madhya Pradesh